Aspen High School is a public high school located in Aspen, Colorado.

Athletics

Teams
Aspen's athletic teams are nicknamed the Skiers and the school's colors are black and red. Aspen teams compete in the following sports:

Football
Cross country
Boys golf
Boys soccer
Boys tennis
Softball
Volleyball
Nordic skiing
Alpine skiing
Girls basketball
Boys basketball
Ice hockey
Girls swimming
Baseball
Boys lacrosse
Girls lacrosse
Girls golf
Girls soccer
Girls tennis
Track

State championships

Boys lacrosse
2015 4A State Champions
Boys skiing
2000 Colorado High School Activities Association State Champions
2002 CHSAA State Champions
2005 CHSAA State Champions
2007 CHSAA State Champions
2009 CHSAA State Champions
2012 CHSAA State Champions
2014 CHSAA State Champions
2018 CHSAA State Champions
2019 CHSAA State Champions
2020 CHSAA State Champions
Girls skiing
2000 CHSAA State Champions
2001 CHSAA State Champions
2002 CHSAA State Champions
2003 CHSAA State Champions
2011 CHSAA State Champions
2012 CHSAA State Champions
2016 CHSAA State Champions
2016 CHSAA State Champions
2018 CHSAA State Champions
Boys golf
2018 3A CHSAA State Champions
Girls swimming
2017 3A CHSAA State Champions
Boys lacrosse
2015 4A CHSAA State Champions
Girls cross country
2002 3A CHSAA State Champions
Boys cross country
1986 Division II CHSAA State Champions
Ice hockey
2007 CHSAA State Champions

Demographics
Aspen High School enrolled 565 students during the 2018–19 school year. 498 were Caucasian, 53 were Hispanic, nine were Asian, and four were African American.

References

External links
 

Public high schools in Colorado